Robert Burns (1759–1796) was a Scottish poet.

Robert Burns may also refer to:

People
Robert Burnes (1719–1789), uncle of Robert Burns the poet
Robert Burns (artist) (1869–1941), Scottish Art nouveau and Decorative arts painter and designer
Robert Burns (cyclist) (born 1968), Australian cyclist
Robert Burns (Iowa politician) (1922–2001), Iowa state senator
Robert Burns (New Hampshire politician)
Robert Burns (New Jersey politician) (1926–2016), member of the New Jersey General Assembly
Robert Burns (Oklahoma politician) (1874–1950), American attorney and politician
Robert Burns (Quebec politician) (1936–2014), Canadian politician from Quebec
Robert Burns (representative) (1792–1866), U.S. Representative from New Hampshire
Robert Burns (theologian) (1789–1869), Scottish theological writer and church leader
Robert A. Burns (1944–2004), art director and production designer
Sir Robert Andrew Burns (born 1943), British diplomat
Robert Easton Burns (1805–1863), Canadian lawyer, judge, and Chancellor of the University of Toronto
Robert Elliott Burns (1892–1955), author of I Am a Fugitive from a Georgia Chain Gang!
Robert Francis Burns (1840–1883), convicted murderer
Robert H. Burns (1870–?), Wisconsin State Assemblyman
Robert J. Burns, software architect and candidate in the United States House of Representatives elections in Illinois, 2010
Robert K. Burns (1896–1982), American biologist known for sexual differentiation in vertebrates
Robert L. Burns (1876–1955), Los Angeles city councilman
Robert Lee Burns (c. 1930–2002), American bank robber involved in an extradition cause célèbre
Robert Nicholas Burns (born 1956), American diplomat
Robert Whitney Burns (1908–1964), US Air Force Lieutenant General
Bobby Burns (footballer) (Robert Joseph Burns, born 1999), Northern Irish footballer
Rob Burns (born 1953), English/New Zealand bass player and author
Robbie Burns (footballer) (born 1990), English footballer

Statues

 Bust of Robert Burns (Houston), Texas, United States
 Robert Burns (Steell), by John Steell
 Robert Burns (Stevenson), by William Grant Stevenson
 Robert Burns Memorial (Barre), by J. Massey Rhind
 Robert Burns Memorial (Montreal), by G. A. Lawson

See also
Bobby Burns (disambiguation)
Bob Burns (disambiguation)
Robert Byrne (disambiguation)
Robert Burn (disambiguation)
Rob Byrnes (born 1958), American gay novelist and blogger

Burns, Robert